Jukdo may refer to:

 Jukdo (island), a small islet next to Ulleungdo
 Shinai, a practice sword used primarily in Kendo or Kumdo (Korean Kendo)